Thomas Van De Nadort (14 July 1894 – 19 October 1967) was an Australian rules footballer who played with South Melbourne in the Victorian Football League (VFL).

Notes

External links 

Tom Nadort's playing statistics from The VFA Project

1894 births
1967 deaths
Australian rules footballers from Victoria (Australia)
Sydney Swans players
Brunswick Football Club players